Jacob Frolich (1837–1890) was a newspaper publisher and served as Arkansas Secretary of State.

He was born in Oberndorf, Germany in Bavaria and emigrated to the United States with his family. John Frolich and Marie Elizabeth Herrman were his parents. 

The family lived in various states. Frolich settled in Searcy, Arkansas. He purchased Curran Hall after the American Civil War. He founded and published the White County Record, a Democrat Party affiliated paper. He served as Secretary of State of Arkansas for three terms from 1879 to 1885. A portrait of him is part of the Arkansas Digital Archives.

He corresponded with Fontaine Richard Earle. Records of his expenses from the Secretary of State office exist.

He married Mollie Gaines Finley September 2, 1869 and they had three children: Pearl, Finley, and Herman. The Arkansas Digital Archives have a collection of his papers.

References

1837 births
1890 deaths
People from Searcy, Arkansas
People from Donau-Ries
German emigrants to the United States
Arkansas Democrats
19th-century American newspaper founders